The Poltava is an old Ukrainian dual-purpose breed of chicken named after the Ukrainian city of Poltava. It includes three color varieties: Clay, Cuckoo, and Black.

Breed and variety names 
 Ukrainian Names: полтавська (глиняста, зозуляста, чорна)
 English Names: Poltava (Clay, Cuckoo, Black)
 Russian Names: полтавская (глинистая, зозулястая, черная)

Genetic analysis 
The Poltava Clay variety was included in the studies of genetic diversity and relationships between various chicken breeds:
Moiseyeva et al. (1994)
Nikiforov et al. (1998)
 Romanov and Weigend (2001)
Semyenova et al. (2002)
Moiseyeva et al. (2003)
Hillel et al. (2003)

The latter study was done in 1998—2000 within the framework of an international research project entitled «Development of Strategy and Application of Molecular Tools to Assess Biodiversity in Chicken Genetic Resources», or shortly AVIANDIV, that was sponsored by European Commission and co-ordinated by Dr. Steffen Weigend, of the Institute for Animal Breeding, Mariensee, Germany.

The AVIANDIV project employed anonymous genetic markers, so called microsatellite loci spread across the whole genome. It was shown that 33 populations had no unique alleles, and 14 populations had one unique allele.

See also
 Federal Agricultural Research Centre

References 

 Hillel J, Groenen MAM, Tixier-Boichard M, Korol AB, David L, Kirzhner VM, Burke T, Barre-Dirie A, Crooijmans RPMA, Elo K, Feldman MW, Freidlin PJ, Mäki-Tanila A, Oortwijn M, Thomson P, Vignal A, Wimmers K, Weigend S. Biodiversity of 52 chicken populations assessed by microsatellite typing of DNA pools. Genet Sel Evol. 2003 Sep-Oct;35(5):533-57.
 Moiseyeva IG, Semyenova SK, Bannikova LV, Filippova ND (1994) Genetic structure and origin of an old Russian Orloff chicken breed. Genetika 30:681-694. (In Russian, abstract in English).
 Moiseyeva IG, Romanov MN, Nikiforov AA, Sevastyanova AA, Semyenova SK (2003) Evolutionary relationships of Red Jungle Fowl and chicken breeds. Genet Sel Evol 35:403-423
 Moiseyeva, I.G., Kovalenko, A.T., Mosyakina, T.V., Romanov, M.N., Bondarenko, Yu.V., Kutnyuk, P.I., Podstreshny, A.P., Nikiforov, A.A. & Tkachik, T.E. (2006) Origin, history, genetics and economic traits of the Poltava chicken breed. Elektronnyi zhurnal [Electronic Journal], Issue 4 (Laboratory of Animal Comparative Genetics, N.I. Vavilov Institute of General Genetics, Moscow, Russia). (In Russian).
 Moiseyeva, I.G., Romanov, M.N., Kovalenko, A.T., Mosyakina, T.V., Bondarenko, Yu.V., Kutnyuk, P.I., Podstreshny, A.P. & Nikiforov, A.A. (2007) Poltava chicken breed of Ukraine: history, characterisation and conservation. Animal Genetic Resources Information 40:71-8.
 Nikiforov AA, Moiseeva IG, Zakharov IA. Position of Russian chicken breeds in the diversity of Eurasian breeds. Genetika. 1998 Jun;34(6):850-1. (In Russian, abstract in English).
 Romanov MN, Weigend S. Analysis of genetic relationships between various populations of domestic and jungle fowl using microsatellite markers. Poult Sci. 2001 Aug;80(8):1057-63.
 Scherf, B.D. (Ed.). 1995. World Watch List for Domestic Animal Diversity. 2nd edn., FAO, Rome, Italy.
 Scherf, B.D. (Ed.). 2000. World Watch List for Domestic Animal Diversity. 3rd edn., FAO, Rome, Italy.
 Semyenova SK, Moiseeva IG, Vasil’ev VA, Filenko AL, Nikiforov AA, Sevast’ianova AA, Ryskov AP. Genetic polymorphism of Russian, European, and Asian chicken breeds as revealed with DNA and protein markers. Genetika. 2002 Sep;38(9):1304-8. (In Russian, abstract in English).

External links 

 Detailed breed information: Moiseyeva et al. (2006) (in Russian)
 Poltava Clay description: EFABIS; Agriculture Encyclopedia (in Russian)
 Poltava Clay line description:
 P5  (EFABIS)
 P6  (EFABIS)
 P14  (EFABIS)
 P37  (EFABIS)
 P41  (EFABIS)
 Poltava Clay performance: VNITIP.ru 

Chicken breeds originating in Ukraine